The following list contains the cross-country skiing trails in Switzerland. 160 cross-country ski run organizations, united under the umbrella organizations Loipen Schweiz (German- and Italian-speaking Switzerland) and Romandie Ski de Fond (French-speaking Switzerland), together maintain a cross-country ski trail network of around 5500 km.

The trail reports with the current snow conditions are available on the websites of Switzerland Tourism and Bergfex.

Einzelnachweise 

Cross-country skiing in Switzerland